Joseph Boughey (1873 – 1935) was an English footballer who played for Burslem Port Vale.

Career
Boughey joined Burslem Port Vale in October 1893. His debut came at right-half in a 2–1 win over Woolwich Arsenal at the Athletic Ground on 6 January 1894. He played a total of five Second Division games in the 1893–94 season. Despite being able to play in most positions he failed to break into the first team regularly, featuring just six times in 1894–95 and once in the 1895–96 campaign, and was instead released in the summer of 1896. He moved on to Audley.

Career statistics
Source:

References

1873 births
1935 deaths
Footballers from Staffordshire
English footballers
Association football midfielders
Port Vale F.C. players
English Football League players